Stenosolenium is a monotypic genus of flowering plants belonging to the family Boraginaceae. The only species is Stenosolenium saxatile.

Its native range is Southern Siberia to Mongolia.

References

Boraginoideae
Boraginaceae genera
Monotypic asterid genera